Leonard "Lenny" Mirra was an American state legislator who served in the Massachusetts House of Representatives. He is a Georgetown resident and a member of the Republican Party.

Mirra represented the Second Essex District in the Massachusetts House of Representatives. For the majority of Mirra’s tenure, the Second Essex included the towns of Newbury, West Newbury, Groveland, Merrimac, Georgetown, precinct 2 and 3 of Boxford, Haverhill's ward 4 precinct 3, and Haverhill's ward 7 precinct 3. 

Following redistricting efforts in 2021, the Second Essex district now includes Georgetown, Newbury, Rowley, Ipswich, Hamilton, and Topsfield’s first precinct.

Mirra worked in the construction industry for 30 years. He spends his free time fishing and gardening.

2022 Election Aftermath
In the 2022 midterm elections, Mirra initially won his election by 10 votes. After a recount it was concluded that he lost to challenger Kristen Kassner by 1 vote. After the loss, Mirra took legal action, but the Essex County Superior Court of Massachusetts dismissed the suit claiming that the court lacked jurisdiction on the matter. Mirra's suit was also dismissed on appeal.

On January 4, 2023 the Massachusetts House of Representatives formed a special committee to review the results of the 2022 Second Essex District’s Election. As a result, Mirra served as a "hold-over" Representative. On January 31, 2023, the special committee voted 2-1, recommending to the full House of Representatives that Kristin Kassner be sworn in as the winner of the election. Mirra left office on February 3, 2023, following the swearing-in of Kristin Kassner.

Electoral history

See also
 2019–2020 Massachusetts legislature
 2021–2022 Massachusetts legislature

References

Living people
Republican Party members of the Massachusetts House of Representatives
People from West Newbury, Massachusetts
21st-century American politicians
Woburn Memorial High School alumni
1964 births